is a Japanese singer-songwriter, and a prominent figure in Japanese popular music. Yoko Yazawa of The Generous is his daughter. He has been nicknamed as Ei-chan (永ちゃん), Boss or The King of Rock.

Biography
Sources:

1949-1967: Early Life on Hiroshima
Eikichi Yazawa was born in Hiroshima, on September 14, 1949. His father was a cycle shop owner but died of radiation sickness when Eikichi was in the 2nd grade of elementary school. His mother disappeared, leaving her husband and son when Eikichi was 3 years old. He was mainly raised by his paternal grandmother in poverty until his graduation from high school. Undergoing bullying, such as having a cake thrown at his face, he started to think and practice "being big,” which allowed him to live through poverty and bullying.

When he was in junior high school, he became interested in listening to music such as The Ventures and The Beatles, which lead him to a career as a rock musician. He started to learn the guitar, and on New Year's Day of 1968, he composed his first song, I Love You, OK.

1968-1975: Yokohama, "Carol"
In 1968, three weeks after he graduated from the high school, Yazawa departed Hiroshima by local train to Tokyo. But on the way, he decided to get off the train and start living in Yokohama, because of a pain from sitting on the train for a long time.

Making ends meet by working a few jobs, he formed several bands: "The Base," "E-Set" and "Yamato" with exchanging the members. All of these bands mainly played in the clubs of Yokohama. But after the breakup of "Yamato," Japanese musical trends switched to folk music, which lead to several clubs’ closure one after another.

In the beginning of 1972, he started recruiting members of a new band by putting up posters on the walls of music stores. With these new members, Johnny Okura (side guitar and side vocals) and Toshikatsu Uchiumi (lead guitar), he formed the band "Carol." Yazawa was the lead vocalist and bassist of the band. The band received wide recognition since their appearance on the October 1 episode of TV program "Live Young!" on Fuji TV. On December 20 of the same year, Carol released their debut single "Louisiana", under the production of Mickey Curtis who watched their performance on the program. Mickey also introduced a drummer, You Okazaki, who later become a member of the band.

Carol's style was deeply influenced by The Beatles, especially when they were based in Liverpool. With their riders’ jacket and pompadour hairstyle, or with early rock ‘n’ roll style numbers, along with the cover version of western music like "Johnny B. Goode" or "You've Really Got a Hold on Me", the band gained notable popularity and greatly influenced Japanese popular music. Their biggest hit Funky Monkey Baby (released on June 25, 1973) became a standard number of Japanese rock music.

Carol broke up in 1975 after their infamous final concert in Hibiya Open-Air Concert Hall, Tokyo. After the last song Last Chance was played, firecrackers accidentally exploded and burned down the stage. This event is referred to as the biggest "Hibiya Legend" in the history of this traditional hall.

1975-1980: Solo Debut, Hard Times and Gold Rush
In May 1975, Yazawa flew to the U.S. in order to start his solo career under the label of CBS Sony. His first solo album, I Love You, OK, was recorded at the A&M Studio in Los Angeles and produced by The Godfather soundtrack producer, Tom Mack. This album got generally unfavorable critics at the first time because of the big switching of his rock music style. Thus, his first solo concert tour, E.YAZAWA Around Japan Part-1, ended up with disastrous result, even couldn't fulfilled the hall in Sasebo city, Nagasaki, which capacity is only 1,500 audiences. He made an oath to himself under the catchphrase of "Remember Sasebo", that become top-sold rock artist of Japan. He continued to hold the concert everywhere in Japan, so that gave the impression that former Carol's leader become a solo artist.

On July 24, 1976, he finally back to Hibiya Hall, under the name of The Star in Hibiya, with full capacity audiences and new album A Day. This concert's back band was The Sadistics. In the tour of this year, 33000 Miles Road Japan, he held 66 concerts, with gaining the recognition as superstar artist of rock steadily.
After the remarkable success of third album Open Your Heart, Yazawa held his first solo rock singer live performance at Nippon Budokan, on August 26, 1977, to a full crowd of over 13,000 people. The live album, Super Live Nippon Budokan, which contains most part of this concert, released 3 months after this show. This album is often described as the best live album of Japanese rock music.

The year of 1978 is regarded as one of the golden years of Yazawa's career. Not only his 4th album Goldrush, which later rated No. 5 on list of the "100 Greatest Japanese Rock Albums of All Time" of Rolling Stones Japan, went to #1 in the Oricon charts, but also his autobiography Nari-Agari (lit. Upstart) which edited by Shigesato Itoi, sold over a million copies. On August 28, he performed at the concert in Korakuen Stadium in front of 50,000 audiences. He also ranked 1st of top earning musician by Japanese government, beat the Enka queen Hibari Misora. On the following year, he performed in 96 places, including Nagoya Stadium.

But he feels "emptiness" by being a top, situation that getting everything he wanted. In 1980, Yazawa signed a contract with the Warner Pioneer (present Warner Music Japan) record company and moved to the West Coast of the United States. He tried to defeat the emptiness by struggling on the new stage.

1981-1987: Career in the United States, Performing with The Doobie Brothers
Yazawa moved into Los Angeles and started to find musicians to make his new album in English. In 1981, he released first English album Yazawa. This album is produced by Bobby LaKind of the Doobie Brothers, and Paul Barrere of Little Feat. The musician of this album includes John McFee, Patrick Simmons, Keith Knudsen, Cornelius Bumpus, Willie Weeks, Richard Hayward, Kenny Gradney, and Mark Jordan. He also released album Rising Sun for the Japanese fan.

In 1982, he released single Rockin’ My Heart and second English album YAZAWA It's Just Rock’n’Roll under the producing of Bobby and John McFee. Rockin’ My Heart is recommended on February 19, 1983 issue of the Billboard magazine. He also released the album P.M.9 for the Japanese fans. On September, he started concert tour named P.M.9 1982 E.YAZAWA Concert Tour, with John McFee, Richie Zito, Dennis Belfield, Keith Knudsen, Mark Jordan, and Bobby LaKind. This tour includes 2 Budokan lives. John and Keith would be long term musician of Yazawa's concert tour until 1996.

On the next few years, Yazawa released album in Japanese. The album of 1984, E’ is the first album producing by Andrew Gold. In 1985, he sang on the Live Aid. His performance of the song Take It Time was broadcast worldwide. In this term, Yazawa's music style is almost can be described as AOR, under the influence of these American friends. Yazawa's marketing in the U.S. is not successful, because he didn't get enough explanation that the Warner Pioneer didn't advertise or commit other marketing tactics. They just did the distribution contract with Elektra/Asylum, which didn't have to advertise Yazawa's music. Yazawa knew this fact and decided to go to EMI Music Japan, with going back to his country. In 1987 he released last album in English, Flash in Japan, only in America at first (it released in Japan in 1999). In the tour of this year, Rock’n’Roll Knight 2, bassist George Hawkins joined into Yazawa's concert tour. He would play for Yazawa's tour until 2016.

1988-1999: Media Appearance
In 1988, Yazawa's first album in EMI, Kyohansha (lit. Accomplice), is released. This album is recorded in London, with the musicians in the U.K. like Alan Murphy, Micky Moody, Jimmy Copley. He held 76 concerts in this year, with the last one in his first Tokyo Dome. On the next year, he held other 2 concerts at the same place. On the tour of 1990, Rock’n’Roll Army, Keyboardist Guy Allison is joined. He supports his concert until today.
The album in 1991, Don't Wanna Stop, is the new challenge for him. Half of this album recorded in London under the producing of George McFarlane, another half in L.A. producing by Andrew Gold.

In 1992, he started to appear in the advertisement of Suntory's brand-new canned coffee product, Boss. It was very surprising commercial because he played an unfortunate salaryman, breaking the impression of rock music charisma. In this period, Yazawa continually appeared on the media. In 1994, he starred in the drama Ari Yo Saraba (lit. goodbye, ants) as a high school biology teacher. In this drama, he sings both opening theme and ending theme.

In 1995, after 20 years of his solo debut, Yazawa held the concert tour called Just Tonight, which includes a few stadium or dome concerts (Yokohama Stadium, Hankyu Nishinomiya Stadium, Fukuoka Dome). This concert's backband (John McFee, Bruce Gowdy, George Hawkins, Keith Knudsen, Guy Allison) is referred as the best member of Yazawa's concert.

He tried to record the completely new album in front of his fans in 1996. This event, Open Recording Gig, is released on VHS and DVD, with the recorded album, Maria.
In 1997, he is invited to "songs and visions", the rock festival held in Wembley Stadium as the special guest and representative of Asia, alongside Rod Stewart, Jon Bon Jovi, Chaka Kahn, and Robert Palmer. He sang "Don't Be Cruel" alone, "Heartbreak Hotel" and "Hey Jude" with other musicians.

In 1998, Yazawa was swindled out of about 3.5 billion yen (approx. 35 million US dollars) for a huge building construction project in Australia. It took him several years to pay off the debt.

He also starred in the movie, Ojuken (lit. entrance exam) as a corporate-owned marathon runner. On September 15, 1999, right after the day of his 50th birthday, he held the anniversary concert called Tonight the Night! in Yokohama International Stadium, witch capacity of 70,000 audiences, keeping the promise he did in the book Nari-Agari. Many people believe that this concert is the best performance of his career or history of Japanese rock music.

2000-2012: Period of Musical Challenges
In 1999 and 2000, Yazawa held 3 concerts each year in the U.S. These are the only tour that held outside of Japan.

In 2002, 30th anniversary of his debut, Yazawa tried a few new challenges. First, he held first acoustic tour Voice in 22 cities, besides the normal rock-style concert tour. Second, he performed at Tokyo Stadium at the first time, as his special concert, The Day.

In 2003, he sang "When You Wish Upon a Star", in the Tokyo Disney Sea during the parade is going on, no notice in advance. In this year, Yazawa also appeared at the domestic rock festival for the first time. In this year's tour, he invited Czech National Symphony Orchestra to hold Rock Opera, under the concept of "fusion of rock and classical music".
In December 2005, Yazawa ran a sold-out Japan tour of "live houses" (Japanese-English for a live-music club) as a part of his "back to roots" approach to his 30th anniversary as a solo artist, following the breakup of rock band Carol in 1975. 'Ei-chan' delighted fans with a rendition of "Whiskey Coke," a hit from that year (and a Karaoke library mainstay), as well as numbers from his 2005 album, Only One.

The tour of 2006 is the continuance of Rock Opera, called New Standard -Rock Opera 2-. In this tour, with Czech National Symphony Orchestra, he played some orchestrated version of songs, including epic version of his popular ballad, "Tokyo". He also played jazz version of the songs in the Blue Note Tokyo, traditional jazz club.

On December 16, 2007, Yazawa achieved 100th concert at Nippon Budokan for the first time. On this day, he appeared in the same clothes as the first Budokan concert. In addition, he chose "Come on Baby" as the opening number, just like the first Budokan live started. John McFee, George Hawkins, and Guy Allison joined as the special guest in this historical concert.

On September 19, 2009, 5 days after the day of his 60th birthday, he held the concert in Tokyo Dome, for the first time in 20 years. Kyosuke Himuro, Hiroto Kōmoto, and Masatoshi Mashima joined as special guests to sing "Kuroku Nuritsubuse (lit. fill it with darkness)" with Yazawa.
And on September 1, 2012, he hold the concert called Blue Sky, in Yokohama International Stadium (now as Nissan Stadium) to commemorate his 40th anniversary of his debut. In this live, former Carol guitarist Toshikatsu Uchiumi appeared as a guest to play a few Carol hits, including "Funky Monkey Baby", and their debut single "Louisiana".

2013-2021: Holding the Several Dome Concerts, and the Coronavirus Pandemic
From 2013 to 2016, Yazawa reduced the number of concerts on his annual tour. He mainly held the concerts in large cities like Tokyo, Osaka, Fukuoka, Nagoya. Instead of this reduction, he formed the band called Z's with young musicians and hold the live in the provincial cities like Miyazaki, Shizuoka, Akita, and so on.

In the Christmas of 2013, he started to have the dinner show called Dreamer in Grand Hyatt Tokyo. This show held in the Christmas season of 2014, 2016, and 2019. The version of Christmas day of 2016 is released in Blu-ray and DVD on the following year.

On September 5, 2015, Rock in Dome, his 5th Tokyo Dome concert is held. The dome was filled with a full crowd of over 50,000 audiences. For this concert, he filmed the video work of riding the motorcycle at the California area.

In 2017, he resumed large-scale live tour, Traveling Bus 2017. This tour is named after 1977 concert tour Traveling Bus, which includes 1st Budokan live. This tour's band including Geoff Dugmore, Jeff Kollman, Guy Allison, and Snake Davis.

In 2018, because his age is turning into 69 (the number 69 can be read as "rock" in Japanese), the tour called Stay Rock is held in 5 cities, which includes his first concert in Kyocera Dome Osaka. The toured finished in Tokyo Dome on September 15, 2018. This live is aired on television.

Two concerts in 2019 tour Rock Must Go On were canceled because of Yazawa's throat ache. That was his first time to cancel his concert. He successfully came back on the live in Sendai, and the tour was concluded in Osaka-jō Hall. He planned the extra concerts of this tour in 2020 but canceled due to Coronavirus pandemic. During the pandemic, he distributed three unreleased live on streaming service.
Yazawa has been back on stage in the autumn of 2021. In this tour I'm Back!! -Rock is Unstoppable-, he held 31 concerts in 23 cities, including 4 concerts in Nippon Budokan.

2022-present: Half-Century Anniversary, "King of Rock"
In the year of 2022, half-century anniversary of his debut, Yazawa continues his activities. In July, the rock festival organized by Yazawa himself is held. And on August 27, he started the 50th anniversary stadium and dome tour My Way from the Japan National Stadium. NHK reported this live's rehearsal, calling him as "King of Rock". That was first concert held in this place with audiences (idol group Arashi taped the concert without audiences in 2020). The tour will continue in Fukuoka Dome on September 17, Kyocera Dome Osaka on September 24.

Discography

Singles
Sources:
I Love You, OK (September 21, 1975)
Mayonaka no Rock n' Roll (真夜中のロックンロール (lit. Rock n' Roll of Midnight)) (March 21, 1976)
Hikishio (ひき潮 (lit. Ebb Tide)) (September 21, 1976)
Kuroku Nuritsubuse (黒く塗りつぶせ (lit. Fill It With Darkness)) (June 21, 1977)
Jikan yo Tomare (時間よ止まれ (lit. Let time stop)) (March 21, 1978)
I Say Good-Bye, So Good-Bye (April 1, 1979)
This Is A Song For Coca-Cola (March 10, 1980)
Namida no Love Letter (涙のラブレター (lit. Love Letter of Tears)) (May 10, 1980)
Love That Was Lost (抱かれたい、もう一度 (lit. I Want to Hold You, Once More)) (April 25, 1981)
You (September 25, 1981)
Yes My Love (February 20, 1982)
Lahaina (April 10, 1982)
Rockin' My Heart (October 9, 1982)
Misty (June 29, 1983)
Last Christmas Eve (November 16, 1983)
The Border (March 10, 1984)
Toubousha (逃亡者 (lit. Runaways)) (July 10, 1984)
Take It Time (June 25, 1985)
Believe in Me (May 25, 1986)
Flash in Japan (May 13, 1987)
Kyohansha (共犯者 (lit. Accomplice)) (July 6, 1988)
New Grand Hotel (ニューグランドホテル) (September 21, 1988)
Kuchizuke ga Tomaranai (くちづけが止まらない (lit. Can't Stop Kissing)) (November 30, 1988)
Somebody's Night (April 26, 1989)
Itoshi Kaze (愛しい風 (lit. Lovely Breeze)) (July 19, 1989)
Ballad yo Eien ni (バラードよ永遠に (lit. Ballad Forever)) (October 11, 1989)
Pure Gold (May 23, 1990)
Yume no Kanata (夢の彼方 (lit. Over the Dream)) (April 19, 1991)
Last Scene (ラスト・シーン) (May 31, 1991)
Big Beat (December 11, 1991)
Anytime Woman (June 3, 1992)
Anytime Woman -English Version- (June 17, 1992)
Tokyo (東京) (February 10, 1993)
Tasogare ni Sutete (黄昏に捨てて (lit. Abandon in Twilight)) (October 27, 1993)
Ari yo Saraba (アリよさらば (lit. Goodbye, Ants)) (April 27, 1994)
Itsuno Hi ka (いつの日か (lit. Someday)) (May 25, 1994)
Natsu no Owari (夏の終り (lit. End of the Summer) (February 8, 1995)
Aozora (青空 (lit. Blue Sky)) (May 24, 1995)
Maria (May 16, 1996) incl. vocals by Zeeteah Massiah
Mouhitori no Ore (もうひとりの俺 (lit. Another Myself)) (November 7, 1996)
Still (September 3, 1997)
Anohi no Youni (あの日のように (lit. Like that Day)) (November 7, 1997)
Chinatown (チャイナタウン) (July 29, 1998)
Oh! Love Sick (June 30, 1999)
The Truth (August 9, 2000)
Tonight I Remember (October 25, 2000)
Senakagoshi no I Love You (背中ごしの I Love You (lit. I Love You Through the Back) (August 29, 2001)
Kusari wo Hikichigire (鎖を引きちぎれ (lit. Tear the Chains)) (July 26, 2002)
Only One (August 24, 2005)
Natsu no Owari (夏の終り (lit. End of the Summer) (September 5, 2007)
Loser (February 25, 2009)
Cobalt no Sora (コバルトの空 (lit. Sky of Cobalt Blue) (June 3, 2009)

Albums
Sources:
I LOVE YOU, OK (September 21, 1975)
A Day (June 21, 1976)
Open Your Heart (ドアを開けろ (lit. Open the Door)) (April 21, 1977)
Gold Rush (ゴールドラッシュ) (June 1, 1978)
KISS ME PLEASE (June 21, 1979)
KAVACH (June 10, 1980)
YAZAWA (August 5, 1981)
RISING SUN (October 25, 1981)
P.M.9 (July 10, 1982)
YAZAWA (1981)
It's Just Rock'n Roll (December 4, 1982)
I am a Model (July 20, 1983)
E' (July 25, 1984)
YOKOHAMA Hatachi Mae (YOKOHAMA二十才まえ (lit. Yokohama, Before the age of 20)) (July 25, 1985)
TEN YEARS AGO (November 28, 1985)
Tokyo Night (東京ナイト) (July 25, 1986)
FLASH IN JAPAN (May 18, 1987)
Kyohansha (共犯者 (lit. Accomplice)) (July 21, 1988)
Jyoji (情事 (lit. Love Affair)) (June 21, 1989)
Eikichi (永吉) (July 31, 1990)
DON'T WANNA STOP (July 5, 1991)
Anytime Woman (June 24, 1992)
HEART (March 31, 1993)
the Name Is... (July 6, 1994)
Somewhere in the Dark (この夜のどこかで (lit. Somewhere in This Night)) (July 5, 1995)
MARIA (July 3, 1996)
YES (August 8, 1997)
SUBWAY EXPRESS (September 8, 1998)
LOTTA GOOD TIME (August 6, 1999)
STOP YOUR STEP (September 27, 2000)
YOU, TOO COOL (September 7, 2001)
SUBWAY EXPRESS 2 (September 4, 2002)
Yokogao (横顔 (lit. Profile)) (September 1, 2004)
ONLY ONE (September 14, 2005)
Rock 'n' Roll (August 5, 2009)
Twist (June 9, 2010)
Only One -touch up- (July 6, 2011)
Last Song (August 1, 2012)
Itsuka, Sono Hi ga Kuru Hi made (いつか、その日が来る日まで... (lit. Until Someday that the Day would come...)) (September 4, 2019)

Live albums
Sources:
THE STAR IN HIBIYA (November 21, 1976)
 (November 21, 1977)
LIVE Korakuen Stadium (LIVE 後楽園スタジアム) (December 5, 1978)
The Rock 6.2.1980 NIPPON BUDOKAN LIVE (November 28, 1980)
1982 P.M.9 LIVE (March 26, 1983)
STAND UP!! 5 Years Realive Document (February 15, 1989)
Anytime Woman LIVE ALBUM (September 30, 1992)
LIVE! YES, E (April 22, 1998)
LIVE DECADE 1990~1999 (March 29, 2000)
CONCERT TOUR "Z" 2001 (March 30, 2002)
Live History 2000~2015 (March 5, 2018)

Compilations
Sources:
THE GREAT OF ALL (July 1, 1980)
THE GREAT OF ALL VOL.2 (December 1, 1980)
THE GREAT OF ALL -Special Version- (November 21, 1983)
THE BORDER (February 15, 1984)
ROCK'N ROLL (March 25, 1988)
BALLAD (March 25, 1988)
THE ORIGINAL (October 31, 1990)
THE ORIGINAL 2 (December 8, 1993)
E. Y 70'S (October 1, 1997)
E. Y 80'S (October 1, 1997)
E. Y 90'S (October 1, 1997)
Your Songs 1 (May 17, 2006)
Your Songs 2 (May 17, 2006)
Your Songs 3 (May 17, 2006)
Your Songs 4 (September 26, 2007)
Your Songs 5 (September 26, 2007)
Your Songs 6 (September 26, 2007)
ALL TIME BEST ALBUM (May 15, 2013)
ALL TIME BEST ALBUM II (July 1, 2015)
STANDARD ~THE BALLAD BEST~ (October 21, 2020)

References

External links
YAZAWA'S DOOR official site 
Nippop  Eikichi Yazawa  Profile

1949 births
Japanese male singer-songwriters
Japanese male rock singers
Living people
Musicians from Hiroshima
The Doobie Brothers
20th-century Japanese male singers
20th-century Japanese singers
21st-century Japanese male singers
21st-century Japanese singers